Baunei is a comune (municipality) in the Province of Nuoro in the Italian island of Sardinia.  It is notable for being the location of the multi-day Selvaggio Blu coastal trek.

Geography
It contains the frazione (subdivision) Santa Maria Navarrese, a popular seaside resort.

Baunei borders the following municipalities: Dorgali, Lotzorai, Talana, Triei, Urzulei.

References

External links
 Official website
 Touristic travel guide
 Baunei guide

Cities and towns in Sardinia
Seaside resorts in Italy